Anatolie Ostap (born 22 November 1979) is a Moldovan former footballer whose last club was Banga Gargždai in Lithuania. Ostap also played for Žalgiris Vilnius and Vetra in Lithuania, Gabala in Azerbaijan, Mash’al Mubarek in Uzbekistan, Tobol in Kazakhstan and Nistru Otaci, Tiligul-Tiras Tiraspol and Agro-Goliador Chişinău in his native Moldova.

Career

Gabala
In January 2009 Ostap signed for Azerbaijan Premier League side Gabala. In the summer of 2010 Ostap left Gabala after playing 31 league games for the club and scoring 1 goal.

Banga Gargždai
Following his release from Gabala, Ostap returned to Lithuania and signed for Banga Gargždai. After 17 league games spanning two years, Ostap had his contract cancelled by Banga Gargždai.

International career
Ostap played twice for the Moldovan Under-16 team and three times for their under-21 team.

Career statistics

References

External links
 
UEFA Profile

1979 births
Living people
Gabala FC players
Place of birth missing (living people)
Association football midfielders
Moldovan footballers
Moldovan expatriate footballers
Expatriate footballers in Kazakhstan
Expatriate footballers in Uzbekistan
Expatriate footballers in Lithuania
Expatriate footballers in Azerbaijan
FC Nistru Otaci players
CS Tiligul-Tiras Tiraspol players
FC Tobol players
FK Mash'al Mubarek players
FK Žalgiris players
FK Vėtra players
FK Banga Gargždai players